"It's Alright, It's OK" is a song by the band Primal Scream. It was released as a single on 7 May 2013, as the second single off of the band's tenth album, More Light.  The song bears resemblance to "Movin' On Up", the first track off of Primal Scream's critically acclaimed 1991 album, Screamadelica.

Track listing
Digital Download
"It's Alright, It's OK" - 5:12
"The Fire of Love" - 2:55

Personnel

Primal Scream
Bobby Gillespie - lead vocals, tambourine
Andrew Innes - guitar, synthesizer

Additional Personnel
Martin Duffy - piano, organ
Jason Faulkner - bass guitar
Davy Chegwidden - drums, percussion
Barrie Cadogan - backing vocals
Geo Gabriel - backing vocals
La Donna Harley Peters - backing vocals
Sharlene Hector - backing vocals
Josh Homme - guitar on "The Fire of Love"

References

2013 singles
Primal Scream songs
2013 songs
Songs written by Bobby Gillespie
Songs written by Andrew Innes